Laurel Mills Historic District is a national historic district located at Laurel Mills, Rappahannock County, Virginia. It encompasses 10 contributing buildings, 1 contributing site, and 1 contributing object in the village of Laurel Mills.  It includes a collection of domestic and commercial buildings that primarily developed in response to a growing mill industry. The buildings primarily date from the 1840s to the early 1900s.  Laurel Mills appears today much as it did when the mill closed in 1927.

It was added to the National Register of Historic Places in 2004.

References

Historic districts in Rappahannock County, Virginia
Victorian architecture in Virginia
National Register of Historic Places in Rappahannock County, Virginia
Historic districts on the National Register of Historic Places in Virginia